Allied Universal is an American private security and staffing company, based in Conshohocken, Pennsylvania and Santa Ana, California. Formed in 2016 by the merger of AlliedBarton and Universal Services of America, Allied Universal is the world's largest provider of security guards. It is also the third largest United States–based employer globally with 800 thousand employees.

History
Allied Universal started as two different companies: AlliedBarton and Universal Protection Services.

AlliedBarton

AlliedBarton was founded as Allied Security in 1957 in Pittsburgh, Pennsylvania as a provider of contracted security guards and related services. 

In 2004, Allied Security acquired Malden, Massachusetts-based Security Systems Inc. (SSI) and Atlanta, Georgia-based Barton Protective Services to form AlliedBarton Security Services - creating the largest American-owned contract security services company in the United States.

Universal Protection Service

Universal Protection Service was founded in 1965. It started as a janitorial company and expanded into security by 1969.

Post merger (2016–present) 
In 2016, AlliedBarton and Universal Services of America merged to form Allied Universal. In February 2017, the company officially began operations under its new name. After the merger, Allied Universal was considered the largest security company in North America.

In January 2018, the company paid $90,000 to settle a religious discrimination lawsuit from a Muslim employee in California who sought a religious exemption to the company’s grooming standards and was fired. Also in 2018, the radio program This American Life ran an hour-long feature story about sexual harassment and racism within Allied's operations at JFK airport and the company's responses to it. In response to the allegations, the company issued a statement saying these “isolated incidents are not indicative of our culture and work ethic,” and it has “zero tolerance against sexual harassment.” A related case was later voluntarily dismissed at the plaintiffs’ request. In July, Allied Universal announced the purchase of Georgia-based US Security Associates along with its affiliate Staff Pro for $1.5 billion.

In 2019, the company was attacked with a ransomware scheme by the Maze group that turned out to be a stunt designed to warn companies about system security flaws. In December, majority owner Wendel sold most of its stake in Allied Universal to a Canadian pension fund Caisse de dépôt et placement du Québec (CDPQ), and a new investment group led by investment company Warburg Pincus and an affiliate of the investment company J. Safra Group.

In January 2021, Allied Universal acquired Atlanta-based competitor SecurAmerica.

G4S acquisition 
In December 2020, the Board of Directors and Shareholders for British security firm G4S unanimously accepted a takeover offer of $5.1 billion USD from Allied Universal. The acquisition was completed in April 2021, creating a combined company of 800,000 employees, with revenues of more than $18 billion USD.

Services & operations

Allied Universal provides security products and services, including access control, intrusion, alarm detection, and IP-based video systems; janitorial; transition planning; green cleaning; and staffing services. Allied Universal operates in the United States, the United Kingdom, Canada, Mexico, Honduras, Puerto Rico, U.S. Virgin Islands, and Nicaragua.  As of February 2022, it employed about 800,000 people.

References

External links
 Official website

Security companies of the United States
Business services companies established in 2016
Companies based in Santa Ana, California
2016 establishments in California